The Reallexikon der Assyriologie und Vorderasiatischen Archäologie (RlA), formerly  Reallexikon der Assyriologie, is a multi-language (English, German, and French) encyclopedia on the Ancient Near East. It was founded by Bruno Meissner in 1922, reformed in 1966 by editor Ruth Opificius and publisher Wolfram von Soden. From  1972 to 2004 edited by Dietz-Otto Edzard, since 2005 by Michael P. Streck.

A team of 585 different authors of many countries have been involved in the project and a total of 15 volumes of which the last was published in 2018.

To be distinguished from the Akkadisches Handwörterbuch (AHw).

References

External links 
 Reallexikon der Assyriologie und Vorderasiatischen Archäologie (online)
 Project Homepage

Assyriology
German encyclopedias
German-language encyclopedias
20th-century encyclopedias